Léon de Lunden (1856–1947) was a Belgian sports shooter who competed at the 1900 Summer Olympics. He won the first prize in the live pigeon shoot, an event that was unique to the 1900 Games and is no longer recognised by the International Olympic Committee. He totaled 21 kills during the tournament to take gold. He won 5,000 francs for his victory.

References

Belgian male sport shooters
Olympic gold medalists for Belgium
Olympic shooters of Belgium
Shooters at the 1900 Summer Olympics
1856 births
1947 deaths
Date of birth missing
Date of death missing
Place of birth missing
Place of death missing
Medalists at the 1900 Summer Olympics
Olympic medalists in shooting